Emperor Xiangzong of Western Xia (1170–1211), born Li Anquan, was the seventh emperor of the Tangut-led Western Xia dynasty of China, reigning from 1206 to 1211. He launched attacks on the Jin dynasty, but eventually surrendered to the Mongol Empire under Genghis Khan.

Reign
Li Anquan was a nephew of the Emperor Renzong. After the death of his father, Renyou, Li Anquan requested Huanzong to allow him inherit father's title. After Huanzong disagreed and bestowed upon him a title of Prince of Zhenyi commandery (镇夷郡王), Li Anquan has been harbouring an intention to seize the imperial throne. Emperor Xiangzong came into power after a coup d'état with his first cousin Huanzong's birth mother, Empress Luo against Huanzong.

Many historians regarded him as incompetent.

Xiangzong attacked the Jin dynasty, destroying the years of peace between these two countries. He tried to become an ally of the Mongol Empire, but Genghis Khan regarded Western Xia as a roadblock to China and repeatedly invaded Western Xia.

Eventually, Li Anquan surrendered to the Mongols, gave his daughter, Chaka, in marriage to Genghis, and paid tribute of camels, falcons, and textiles.

In 1211, Xiangzong's nephew Lǐ Zūnxū initiated a coup d'état against Xiangzong and took power. Xiangzong died a month later.

Family 
Father: Li Renyou, Prince of Yue (越王李仁友)

Consorts and issue:

Daughter:

 Princess Char (察合皇后). Married Genghis Khan in 1209.

References 

1170 births
1211 deaths
Western Xia emperors
13th-century Chinese monarchs
13th-century Tangut rulers
12th-century Tangut people